Jacqueline Doyle-Price (born 5 August 1969) is a British Conservative Party politician and former civil servant. She was first elected as the Member of Parliament (MP) for Thurrock in the 2010 general election.

In September 2022, she was appointed Minister of State for Industry by Prime Minister Liz Truss, however she returned to the back benches following the appointment of Rishi Sunak as Prime Minister.

Early life and education
Jacqueline Doyle-Price was born on 5 August 1969 on a council estate in Sheffield. Growing up in an apolitical working class family, her father Brian Doyle-Price was a bricklayer whilst her mother Kathleen Doyle-Price worked part-time as a sales assistant at Woolworths. She was raised in the suburb of Hillsborough and in the suburb of Wisewood, where she continued to live on a council estate. She attended Notre Dame Roman Catholic High School, a comprehensive school.

Doyle-Price's interest in politics began when she was 14 years-old. Her parents attempted to buy their council house through Margaret Thatcher's Right to Buy scheme and faced resistance from the left-wing Sheffield City Council, which was run by the Labour Party under the local leadership of David Blunkett. Doyle-Price claimed that its left-wing councillors did "everything they could to bully my parents into not buying their council house", and one of her left-wing teachers encouraged her to build upon her new-found interest and participate in politics, suggesting that she "go out and participate in democracy". Following the council's alleged "intimidation of her parents", Doyle-Price joined the Conservatives to campaign for people to buy their council homes in 1986.

Doyle-Price read economics and politics at Durham University. Her constituent college was University College. At Durham, she participated in political activism and joined its student Conservative Association where she worked as an officer with Graham Brady, who would later become a Conservative MP in 1997. Doyle-Price graduated with a Bachelor of Arts Honours degree in 1991.

Career before parliament 
Shortly after graduating from university, Doyle-Price became a researcher on a salary of £1.31 per hour, before spending 18 months moving between temporary jobs and unemployment. In 1992, she was employed by the South Yorkshire Police as an administrative officer, which became her first permanent job. She also worked for the Sheffield Enterprise Agency. From 1993 to 2000, after working for the South Yorkshire Police, she was employed at the City of London Corporation as an assistant parliamentary officer, and from 2000 to 2005 she was an assistant private secretary to the Lord Mayor of the City of London. From 2005, she worked as an associate, policy adviser and consumer advocate for the Financial Services Authority, leaving this job in 2010 to focus on her parliamentary campaign in Thurrock.

Doyle-Price continued her activism after graduation and held several posts in the Conservative Party before her election to parliament. From 1994 to 1997, she was Treasurer of the National Association of Conservative Graduates, and she sat on its national executive. In the 1997 general election, the national party employed her as a press secretary, and from 1997 to 1998 she served as the chairwoman of the Lewisham Deptford Conservative Association. She was also constituency officer of the Greenwich and Woolwich Conservatives from 2006 to 2007. and stood unsuccessfully for election to Greenwich Council.

Parliamentary career
Doyle-Price first stood for election to parliament in the 2005 general election. She was the Conservative candidate for the Sheffield Hillsborough constituency, which included her birthplace, and came third with 15.02% of the vote.

Doyle-Price was elected for the Conservative Party as the Member of Parliament for Thurrock at the 2010 general election, by a majority of 92 (0.2%) after two recounts. She retained her seat in May 2015, with a majority of 536 after a recount and in June 2017 with a majority of 345 - again after a recount. However, in December 2019 Doyle-Price increased her majority massively, to over 11,000 votes, the largest Conservative majority in the seat's history.

Doyle-Price made her maiden speech on 28 June 2010, speaking about the need for welfare reform. She was prepared to publicly challenge ministers on behalf of her constituents, particularly on transport issues connected with the Dartford Crossing and on the Government postponement of work to improve Junction 30 of the M25. In June 2010, she was appointed to the House of Commons committee that is responsible for scrutinising Government spending and whether it is delivering value for money. In May 2012 she was elected Chairman of the All-Party Gurkha Welfare Group.

Doyle-Price was a co-sponsor of the private member's EU membership referendum bill that was given a second reading on 5 July 2013. On 14 January 2014, she led a debate in Westminster Hall on options for the new Lower Thames Crossing.

Doyle-Price was opposed to Brexit prior to the 2016 EU membership referendum.

In the House of Commons she has sat on the Public Accounts Committee and Committee of Selection and Women and Equalities Committee.

Government appointment
Following the 2015 general election, Doyle-Price was appointed as an assistant whip. On 2 December 2015 she was one of the tellers for the "Ayes" (those MPs supporting UK bombing in Syria) and on 1 February 2017 she was the government teller who announced the result of the vote to trigger Article 50 of the Lisbon treaty.

Following the 2017 election she was appointed Parliamentary Under-Secretary of State for Mental Health and Inequalities in the Department for Health. In July 2017, she spoke in parliament in her new role, answering a question from a DUP "shadow". In October 2018, she given additional ministerial responsibility for suicide prevention and co-chaired the Women's Mental Health Taskforce. She left the government following the election of Boris Johnson as leader of the Conservative Party, but returned to government as Minister of State for Industry when Liz Truss was elected as Prime Minister in September 2022. She left the government again following Rishi Sunak's appointment as Prime Minister.

Partner employment
Doyle-Price employs her partner Mark Coxshall as her part-time Office Manager on a salary up to £30,000. The practice of MPs employing family members has been criticised by some sections of the media on the lines that it promotes nepotism. Although MPs who were first elected in 2017 have been banned from employing family members, the restriction is not retrospective – meaning that Doyle-Price's employment of her partner is lawful.

LGBT+ issues
In May 2013 Doyle-Price voted against same-sex marriage on its third reading in the House of Commons, having abstained at the second reading. Doyle-Price stated after the vote that whilst she supported equality for same-sex couples, she regarded marriage as a sacrament, and would have voted in favour of a bill which "sought to equalise civil partnership with civil marriage". She also stated that she would reconsider her position if the bill was amended.

In July 2020, Doyle-Price was critical of the availability of what she described as "dangerous" gender-affirming healthcare for trans children. Earlier in the year on International Women's Day, Doyle-Price suggested in parliament that new legislation was needed to strengthen the provisions for single-sex spaces under the Equality Act 2010.

In December 2020, following the revelation that Eddie Izzard had asked to be referred to with she/her pronouns, Doyle-Price stated in regard to Izzard that: "Being a straight man who likes to cross dress is not being a lesbian in a man's body. No man with respect for women would appropriate female same-sex attraction for themselves."

Personal life

Doyle-Price lives in Purfleet, Thurrock. She holds a surgery every month in Grays, Thurrock. Her husband Mark Coxshall has served as the Conservative leader of Thurrock Council since September 2022.

Doyle-Price is a close friend of former prime minister Liz Truss, and she endorsed her successful campaign in the July–September 2022 Conservative Party leadership election to succeed Boris Johnson as prime minister. In 1997, during her tenure as its chairwoman, Doyle-Price introduced Truss to the Lewisham Deptford Conservative Association, which Truss herself would also chair from 1998 to 2000.

Doyle-Price is a Roman Catholic.

Electoral history

Notes

References

External links

Official website
Conservative Party Profile

BBC Profile 

1969 births
Living people
People educated at Notre Dame High School, Sheffield
Alumni of University College, Durham
Conservative Party (UK) MPs for English constituencies
Female members of the Parliament of the United Kingdom for English constituencies
UK MPs 2010–2015
Politics of Thurrock
Politicians from Sheffield
UK MPs 2015–2017
UK MPs 2017–2019
UK MPs 2019–present
21st-century British women politicians
21st-century English women
21st-century English people